Colobothea appendiculata is a species of beetle in the family Cerambycidae. It was described by Per Olof Christopher Aurivillius in 1902. It is known from Bolivia and French Guiana.

References

appendiculata
Beetles described in 1902
Beetles of South America